Watanose Dam  is a gravity dam located in Hiroshima Prefecture in Japan. The dam is used for power production. The catchment area of the dam is 168.4 km2. The dam impounds about 97  ha of land when full and can store 10424 thousand cubic meters of water. The construction of the dam was completed in 1956.

References

Dams in Hiroshima Prefecture